is a Shinto shrine near Tōdai-ji, Nara, Nara Prefecture, Japan. It is a Hachiman shrine, dedicated to the kami Hachiman. It was established in 749. Kami enshrined here include Emperor Ojin, Emperor Nintoku, Empress Jingū and Emperor Chūai in addition to Hachiman.

See also
Hachiman shrine
List of National Treasures of Japan (crafts: others)

Shinto shrines in Nara Prefecture
8th-century establishments in Japan
Hachiman faith
Chinjusha
Hachiman shrines
8th-century Shinto shrines
Religious buildings and structures completed in 749